David McCooey (born 1967 in London), poet, critic, musician, and academic. He is Personal Chair in Literary Studies and Professional & Creative Writing at Deakin University in Geelong.

Early life and education 
David McCooey was born in London in 1967. He moved to Perth, Western Australia, with his family in 1970. He studied for a BA (hons) at University of Western Australia (1985–1988), and completed his doctorate at Sydney University (1990–1993).

Career 
McCooey is Personal Chair in Literary Studies and Professional & Creative Writing at Deakin University in Geelong and regularly writes reviews for Australian Book Review and The Age. He has been the recipient of a number of ARC (Australian Research Council) awards. From 2004-2006 he was associate editor of Space: New Writing and in 2013 he was inaugural poetry editor of Australian Book Review.

McCooey, described by Nicholas Birns in The Australian as ‘one of the pioneers of Australian studies of life writing’, is the author of a key critical work in Australian autobiography, Artful Histories: Modern Australian Autobiography, which was published by Cambridge University Press in 1996, and re-published in 2009. Artful Histories won a NSW Premier's Literary Award in 1996, and was shortlisted for the Colin Roderick Award for Best Australian Book in 1997. McCooey's first poetry collection, Blister Pack (Salt Publishing), won the 2006 Mary Gilmore Award, and was shortlisted for four other major awards. McCooey is the Deputy General Editor of the Macquarie PEN Anthology of Australian Literature (Allen & Unwin, published internationally by Norton as The Literature of Australia), which won the 'Special Award' in the 2010 NSW Premier's Literary Awards and a 2010 Australian Educational Publishing Award. McCooey's latest book of poetry Outside (Salt Publishing) was published in 2011, and in 2012 it was shortlisted for the Queensland Literary Awards and was a finalist for the Melbourne Prize for Literature's 'Best Writing' award. In her review of Outside in The Australian, Fiona Wright commented on the collection's 'remarkable power to draw the reader in' and its 'shifting and subtle exploration of creativity'. McCooey's poetry has appeared widely in Australian journals, newspapers, and anthologies, including The Best Australian Poems annual anthology in 2006, 2007, 2008, 2009, 2011, 2012, 2013, 2014, 2015, 2016, and 2017 (the final year of the series). His 'poetry soundtracks' (original poetry, music, and sound design) have appeared in various CD issues of literary journals, and have been broadcast on ABC Radio National, 3RRR and elsewhere. An album of poetry soundtracks, Outside Broadcast, was released as a digital download in 2013. His third full-length collection of poetry, Star Struck was published by UWA Publishing in 2016. Writing in The Australian, Geoff Page described the collection as 'disturbingly good and arguably his best so far', concluding that it is an example of 'contemporary Australian poetry at its engaging best'. The Book of Falling, McCooey's fourth full-length collection of poetry, was published in 2023 by Upswell.  In addition to lyric poetry, the collection includes three 'photo poems', featuring found photographs and photographs by McCooey. A photograph by McCooey is also used for the book's cover art. John Kinsella, writing in The Saturday Paper described 'McCooey's gift' as his 'control of tone', noting 'an uncanny sense of that dynamic of distance and intimacy in which McCooey is so proficient'.

McCooey is married to the writer and academic Maria Takolander.

Awards and nominations
 2012 Finalist, Melbourne Prize for Literature’s ‘Best Writing Award’ (triennial, all genres) for Outside
 2012 Short-listed, Queensland Literary Awards (Poetry) for Outside
 2010 New South Wales Premier's Literary Awards for the Macquarie PEN Anthology of Australian Literature
 2010 Winner, The Australian Educational Publishing Awards, Tertiary (Wholly Australian) Scholarly Reference for the Macquarie PEN Anthology of Australian Literature
 2010 Short-listed, Australian Book Industry Awards, General Non-Fiction for the Macquarie PEN Anthology of Australian Literature 
 2006 Winner, Mary Gilmore Award for the best first book of poetry in the preceding two calendar years for Blister Pack
 2006 Finalist, The Melbourne Prize for Literature (New Writing Award) (triennial, all genres) for Blister Pack
 2005 Short-listed, New South Wales Premier's Literary Awards for Blister Pack
 2005 Short-listed, Western Australian Premier's Book Awards for Blister Pack
 2005 Short-listed, The Age Book of the Year Award for Blister Pack
 1997 Short-listed, Colin Roderick Award for Best Australian Book for Artful Histories: Modern Australian Autobiography 
 1996 Winner, New South Wales Premier's Literary Awards, Gleebooks Prize for Critical Writing for Artful Histories: Modern Australian Autobiography

Publications

Poetry
 The Book of Falling (2023)
 Star Struck (2016)
 Outside (2011)
 Graphic (2010)
 Blister Pack (2005)

Audio
 The Apartment (with Paul Hetherington, 2018)
 The Double (2017)
 Outside Broadcast (2013)

Anthology
As Deputy General Editor: Macquarie PEN Anthology of Australian Literature (2009), published internationally as The Literature of Australia (2009)

Literary criticism
Artful Histories: Modern Australian Autobiography (1996)

Professional associations 

 American Association of Australian Literary Studies
 Antipodes: The North American Journal of Australian Literature Life Writing
 Association for the Study of Australian Literature

References
 Judges' Report, 2006 Mary Gilmore Award Retrieved (27 August 2007)
 Research Output for David McCooey 1999 Deakin University Research Report (Retrieved 27 August 2007)

External links 
 Official website
 Contemporary Histories Research Group Profile

1967 births
Australian poets
Living people
University of Western Australia alumni
University of Sydney alumni
Academic staff of Deakin University